The discography of American singer, songwriter, and author Amanda Palmer consists of three solo studio albums, three collaborative studio albums, five extended plays, five live albums, two remix albums, two demo albums, 42 music videos, 35 singles, and 22 promotional singles. She also has released two studio albums, two compilation albums, one extended play, one live album, and eight singles as a member of the band The Dresden Dolls; one studio album and one extended play as a member of the duo Evelyn Evelyn, and one extended play as a member of the group 8in8.

Solo artist

Albums

Studio albums

Collaborative studio albums

Live albums

Remix albums

Demos
 Songs from 1989–1995... (1996)
 Summer 1998 Five Song Demo (1997)

Extended plays

Singles

Promotional singles

Notes:

Live version appeared on An Evening with Neil Gaiman & Amanda Palmer
Included as a pre-order bonus on Who Killed Amanda Palmer but not on the main track list
Studio version appeared on There Will Be No Intermission
Studio version appeared on Theatre Is Evil

Audiobook narration
 The Art of Asking: How I Learned to Stop Worrying and Let People Help (2014)

DVDs
 Who Killed Amanda Palmer: A Collection of Music Videos (2009)

Music videos

Notes

As part of The Dresden Dolls

 The Dresden Dolls (2002)
 A Is for Accident (2003) (live album)
 The Dresden Dolls (2003, reissued 2004)
 Yes, Virginia... (2006)
 No, Virginia... (2008) (compilation)
 The Virginia Monologues (2015) (compiles Yes, Virginia... and No, Virginia...)

As part of Evelyn Evelyn
 Elephant Elephant (EP) (2007)
 Evelyn Evelyn (2010)

As part of 8in8
 Nighty Night (with Damian Kulash, Neil Gaiman & Ben Folds) (2011)

Other appearances

References

Discographies of American artists
Discography